Eternity is the third studio album by Tina Guo. It was released on May 14, 2013.

Track listing

 My Soul Awaits 4:25
 Sanctus 2:32
 Battle Of Zharafin 1:33
 Ray Of Love 2:49
 Ghost Of War 2:11
 The Port 2:55
 Apocalypse 3:09
 Darkness 2:50
 So This Is Love 2:44
 New Beginnings 2:02
 To Be In Your Arms Again 4:02
 Kiss The Sky 3:03
 Breathe Me In 4:29

Release history

References

External links
Eternity
Eternity Tina Guo
Tina Guo - Eternity

2013 albums
Tina Guo albums
Neoclassical albums